Merycoides is an extinct genus of oreodont of the subfamily Merycoidodontinae endemic to North America. Fossils have been uncovered throughout the western U.S. as well as Florida.

Species
 M. cursor Douglass 1907
 M. harrisonensis Schultz & Falkenbach 1949
 M. longiceps Douglass 1907
 M. pariogonus Schultz & Falkenbach 1949
 M. relictus Cope 1884

References

Oreodonts
Oligocene mammals of North America
Oligocene even-toed ungulates
Chattian genus extinctions
Rupelian genus first appearances
Prehistoric even-toed ungulate genera